Minilogue was a Scandinavian melodic Techno music group consisting of Sebastian Mullaert and Marcus Henriksson. The name is a blend of minimal (the musical style) and dialogue, which refers to music as a form of communication.

Beside their music production as Minilogue, they were both involved in the group Son Kite, Trimatic and IMPS (with Ian Chaplin and Philip Rex). They were active from the year 2000 to 2014.

History 

Sebastian Mullaert and Marcus Henriksson came from opposing backgrounds.

Sebastian was trained as a classical musician playing the organ, piano and the violin among other instruments. He even became involved in teaching them until his coming of age at 18 when he formed a band and began experimenting with the sounds in a more contemporary way.

Marcus lived on a diet of Kraftwerk and the Human League until realising his true calling in the techno parties of the 1990s. Through promoting parties he moved on to become one of the bigger DJs in Southern Sweden. It was in a party where they met and decided to combine Sebastian’s musician’s perspective and knowledge with Marcus' DJ skills and experience from the scene.

They got together in 1996 and after 10 years in the music business under successful guises such as Son Kite and Trimatic, Marcus & Sebastian begun to be Minilogue.

They hail from Malmö, a city situated in south Sweden. Through the years their music has expanded and moved through a variety of sounds appealing across the board of electronic music.

Their later material touches on influences from a simplistic early 1990s sound of electronica, filled with warped and wondrous sounds creating textures with true depth and portraying a true sense of the duo’s vision.

Marcus & Sebastian decided to stop Minilogue in 2014 to focus on their own projects.

Discography

References

External links 
Hitchhikers Choice video on Youtube
Discography on discogs.com

Techno music groups
Swedish house music groups
Ableton Live users
Progressive house musicians